is a Japanese sociologist who is Emeritus professor of Rikkyo University (St. Paul university) in Tokyo. At present, a professor at Kyoto Sangyo University in Kyoto. In July 1965 he graduated from Doshisha University. His specialized field is Mass Communication, Journalism, risk management and citizen journalism.

Publications 
 The new media of contemporary (Gakubunsya) 1984.
 The current journalism (Nihon hyoronsya) 1993.
 The History of press control in Okinawa (Yuzankaku)1996.
 The Broadcasting of digital era (Gakubunsya) 1997
 The turning point - Where is Japan going to (Mainichi shinbun) 2000 
 The history of people's journalism in Japan - era of civil rights to Okinawa occupation (Kodansya gakujyutsu bunko) 2001.
 The science of journalism (Yuhikaku) 2001.
 The current war report (Iwanami shinsyo)2004.
 Broadcasting system ethics and journalism in the age of digital-'97 Anglo-Japanese Broadcasting Forum- (1997)

External links 
 Media Institute 21

References

Living people
1942 births
Japanese sociologists
People from Shizuoka Prefecture
Academic staff of Rikkyo University
Doshisha University alumni